Filipe Bento (born September 12, 1969) is an Angolan former footballer and manager who played in the Segunda Liga, Segunda Divisão, Terceira Divisão, and the Canadian Professional Soccer League.

Career 
Bento began his career in 1993 with S.C. Espinho in the Segunda Liga. Throughout his time in Portugal he played in the Segunda Divisao with F.C. Infesta, Lusitânia F.C., A.D. Ovarense, and A.D. Sanjoanense. He also played in the Terceira Divisão with São João de Ver, and Valecambrense. In 2004, he went abroad to the Canadian Professional Soccer League to play with the Vaughan Shooters. In 2006, he retired from competitive football in order to serve as the assistant coach to the Shooters. In 2010, he was appointed the head coach for the organization, where he secured the Shooters a regular season title.

References 

1969 births
Living people
Angolan footballers
S.C. Espinho players
F.C. Infesta players
Lusitânia F.C. players
A.D. Ovarense players
A.D. Sanjoanense players
SC São João de Ver players
York Region Shooters players
Liga Portugal 2 players
Segunda Divisão players
Canadian Soccer League (1998–present) players
Canadian Soccer League (1998–present) managers
York Region Shooters coaches
Association football midfielders
Angolan football managers